The 40th Assembly District of Wisconsin is one of 99 districts in the Wisconsin State Assembly.  Located in central Wisconsin, the district comprises most of Waupaca County and much of the eastern half of Waushara County, as well as a part of western Outagamie County.  It includes the cities of Clintonville, Manawa, Marion, New London, Waupaca, and Weyauwega, as well as the villages of Big Falls, Fremont, Iola, Ogdensburg, and Scandinavia. It also contains most of Hartman Creek State Park and historic sites such as Waupaca's Main Street Historic District and the King Wisconsin Veterans Home, established for veterans of the American Civil War, containing the Veterans Cottages Historic District, the Commandant's Residence Home, and the Veterans Home Chapel.  The district is represented by Republican Kevin D. Petersen, since January 2007.

The 40th Assembly district is located within Wisconsin's 14th Senate district, along with the 41st and 42nd Assembly districts.

List of past representatives

References 

Wisconsin State Assembly districts
Waupaca County, Wisconsin
Waushara County, Wisconsin